Leroy Springs House, also known as Lancaster City Hall, is a historic home located at Lancaster, Lancaster County, South Carolina. The original section was built in 1820–30. The house was greatly enlarged in the mid-1850s and it took its present appearance in a 1906-07 remodeling.  It is a two-story, frame residence.  The façade features a two-tiered pedimented portico defined by fluted columns with Doric order-influenced capitals. The building was converted to municipal use as a city hall in 1957.

It was added to the National Register of Historic Places in 1986.

References

Houses on the National Register of Historic Places in South Carolina
Houses completed in 1907
Houses in Lancaster County, South Carolina
National Register of Historic Places in Lancaster County, South Carolina